Diarmaid is a
masculine given name in the Irish language, which has historically been anglicized as Jeremiah or Jeremy, names with which it is etymologically unrelated. Earlier forms of the name include Diarmit and Diarmuit. Variations of the name include Diarmait and Diarmuid. Anglicised forms of the name include  Dermody,  Dermot and Dermod. Mac Diarmata, anglicised McDermott and similar, is the patronymic and surname derived from the personal name. The exact etymology of the name is debated. The Irish name later spread to Scotland where in Scottish Gaelic the form of the name is Diarmad; Anglicised forms of this name include Diarmid and Dermid.

Diarmaid
 Diarmaid Mac an Bhaird (fl. 1670) Irish poet
 Diarmaid Blake Gaelic footballer
 Diarmaid MacCulloch (born 1951) British church historian
 Diarmaid the Just Irish abbot
 Diarmaid Ó Donnchadha (fl. 1418) Bishop of Kilmacduagh
 Diarmaid FitzGerald  (born 1983) Irish hurler
 Diarmaid Riabach Ó Seachnasaigh (died 1579) Irish lord
 Diarmaid mac Madudan (fl.1032-1069) king of Síol Anmchadha 
 Diarmaid Ua Madadhan (died 1135) King of Síol Anmchadha and Uí Maine
 Diarmaid Ó Cellaigh (died c.1349) King of Uí Maine 
 Diarmaid Ó Seachnasaigh (died before 1567) Irish knight
 Diarmaid Ferriter (born 1973), Irish historian
 Diarmaid Cleirech Ua Madadhan (died 1207) King of Síol Anmchadha
 Diarmaid mac Tadgh Ua Ceallaigh (died 1065) King of Uí Maine
 Diarmaid Ó Máille (died 1415) Irish lord
 Diarmaid Ó Cúlacháin (died 1221) Irish historian and scribe

Diarmait
Diarmait mac Cerbaill, King of Tara, died 565
Diarmait mac Áedo Sláine, Co-king of Tara, died 664
Diarmait ua Tigernáin, abbot of Armagh, died 852
Diarmait mac Máel na mBó, King of Leinster, died 1072
Diarmait mac Murchada, King of Leinster, died 1171
Diarmait of Iona
Diarmait mac Conaing
Diarmait mac Tommaltaig
Diarmait Dian
Diarmait ua Tigernáin
Diarmait Ó Cobhthaigh

Diarmuid
Diarmuid Ua Duibhne, a warrior in Irish mythology
Diarmuid Byron O'Connor, British Sculptor
Diarmuid Connolly (born 1987), Dublin Gaelic football player; hurling player
Diarmuid Dalton, British bass guitarist
Sir Diarmuid Downs (born 1922), British automotive engineer
Diarmuid Gavin  (born 1964), Irish garden designer and television personality
Diarmuid Hegarty (Griffith College), Irish academic; president of Griffith College, Dublin
Diarmuid Kirwan, Irish hurling referee
Diarmuid Lawrence (born 1947), British television director
Diarmuid Lynch (1878–1950), Irish Republican Brotherhood member; Sinn Féin member
Diarmuid Lyng (born 1981), Irish sportsperson
Diarmuid Martin (born 1945), Roman Catholic Archbishop of Dublin and Primate of Ireland
Diarmuid Murphy (born 1975), Irish sportsperson
Diarmuid O'Carroll (born 1987), Irish professional footballer
Diarmuid O'Connor (disambiguation), multiple people
Diarmuid O'Hegarty, Irish revolutionary and civil servant
Diarmuid O'Neill (1969–1996), Provisional Irish Republican Army member
Diarmuid O'Scannlain (born 1937) American jurist (United States Court of Appeals for the Ninth Circuit)
Diarmuid O'Sullivan (born 1978), Irish sportsperson 
Diarmuid Wilson (born 1965), Irish Fianna Fáil politician and member of Seanad Éireann

Mythological
Diarmuid Ua Duibhne, hero of The Pursuit of Diarmuid and Gráinne

Dermot
Dermot Ahern, Irish politician
Dermot Bailey, British professional wheelchair tennis player
Dermot Earley (disambiguation), multiple people
Dermot FitzGerald, Irish businessman and philanthropist
Dermot Gallagher, Irish sports referee
Dermot Honan, Irish politician
Dermot Keely, Irish sports manager and player
Dermot Kennedy, Irish singer, songwriter, and musician
Dermot Mac Curtain, Irish sportsperson
Dermot Malone (fl. 2010s), Irish Gaelic footballer
Dermot Morgan, Irish comedian
Dermot Mulroney, American actor
Dermot Murnaghan, British broadcaster
Dermot O'Leary, English television presenter
Dermot O'Neill (gardener), Irish gardener
Dermot O'Neill (footballer), Irish football player
Dermot Weld, Irish racehorse trainer
Dermott Brereton, Australian sportsperson

Dermod
 Dermod Dwyer, Irish businessman
 Dermod O'Brien (1865-1945) Anglo-Irish painter
 Dermod O'Brien, 2nd Baron Inchiquin (died 1557)
 Dermod O'Brien, 5th Baron Inchiquin (1594–1624)
 Dermod O'Meara (fl.1619) Irish physician and poet

Diarmid 
Diarmid Heidenreich

Surname
Allastair Malcolm Cluny McReady-Diarmid

See also
List of Irish-language given names

References

Irish-language masculine given names